Mima Creek is a stream in Thurston County in the U.S. state of Washington. It is a tributary to the Black River. The upper course of Mima Creek contains the Mima Falls, a waterfall.

"Mima" is a name derived from a Native American language meaning "a little further along" or "downstream".

References

Rivers of Thurston County, Washington
Rivers of Washington (state)